Argyresthia glaucinella is a moth of the family Yponomeutidae. It is found in Europe.

The wingspan is about 9 mm. The head is yellowish-white. Forewings are brassy-fuscous; a whitish dorsal streak, strigulated with dark fuscous; a thick median fascia and apical patch
darker fuscous, with bluish reflections, separated by whitish irroration. Hindwings are grey.

Adults are on wing from June to July depending on the location.

The larvae feed on Quercus, Aesculus hippocastanum and Betula.

References

External links
UKmoths
Swedish Moths

Yponomeutidae
Moths described in 1839
Moths of Europe